The fourth Northern Ireland Assembly was the unicameral devolved legislature of Northern Ireland following the 2011 assembly election on 5 May 2011. This iteration of the elected Assembly convened for the first time on 12 May 2011 in Parliament Buildings in Stormont, and ran for a full term.

The election saw 18 Assembly constituencies return six Members of the Legislative Assembly (MLAs) each. The Democratic Unionist Party (DUP), led by Peter Robinson, remained the largest unionist party and the largest overall. Sinn Féin, led by Gerry Adams, remained the largest Irish nationalist party and the second largest overall. As per the Belfast Agreement and the St Andrews Agreement, a power-sharing coalition was then formed with the DUP, Sinn Féin, the Ulster Unionist Party (UUP), the Social Democratic and Labour Party (SDLP) and the Alliance Party of Northern Ireland. William Hay was elected as Speaker in the first sitting of the Assembly. Following Hay's retirement, Mitchel McLaughlin was elected as the first nationalist Speaker in October 2014.

The UUP, led by Tom Elliott, and the SDLP, led by Margaret Ritchie, secured fewer seats than in the previous assembly. The Alliance Party, led by David Ford, emerged from the election with an increased mandate after securing an additional seat. The four main parties which sat outside of the Northern Ireland Executive and thereby served unofficially in opposition were the Green Party in Northern Ireland, the Traditional Unionist Voice, NI21 and the United Kingdom Independence Party.

More than three quarters of the members of the 3rd Northern Ireland Assembly were re-elected to the 4th: 83 MLAs had been members for all or part of the Assembly's previous term. This included 11 individuals who became MLAs in the previous Assembly by virtue of co-option. Twenty of the MLAs elected in 2011 were women. 25 new MLAs were elected to the Assembly, 23% of the total.

Party strengths

Graphical representation

Leadership
 Speaker: Mitchel McLaughlin (previously Sinn Féin) (from 12 Jan 2015) — William Hay (previously Democratic Unionist Party) (until 13 Oct 2014)
 Principal Deputy Speaker: Robin Newton (Democratic Unionist Party)
 Deputy Speaker: John Dallat (Social Democratic and Labour Party)
 Deputy Speaker: Roy Beggs Jr (Ulster Unionist Party)

Executive
 First Minister and Leader of Democratic Unionist Party: Peter Robinson
 Deputy First Minister: Martin McGuinness
 Assembly Leader of Sinn Féin: Raymond McCartney
 Leader of the Social Democratic and Labour Party: Alasdair McDonnell
 Leader of the Alliance Party of Northern Ireland: David Ford

Opposition
 Leaders of the Ulster Unionist Party: Mike Nesbitt
 Leader of Green Party in Northern Ireland: Steven Agnew
 Leader of NI21: Basil McCrea
 Leader of Traditional Unionist Voice: Jim Allister 
 Assembly Leader of UKIP: David McNarry

MLAs by party
This is a list of MLAs elected to the Northern Ireland Assembly in the 2011 Northern Ireland Assembly election, sorted by party.

Not to be confused: Paul Girvan (South Antrim) and Paul Givan (Lagan Valley) are different people, although both were co-opted to replace retiring Democratic Unionist members of the last Assembly. Roy Beggs, Jr. (born 1962) is the son of the Ulster Unionist Roy Beggs (born 1936), a former Assembly member for North Antrim and former MP for East Antrim in the British House of Commons. Similarly Mark H. Durkan (b. 1978) is the nephew of the former SDLP leader Mark Durkan (b. 1960), who left the Assembly after his election in 2010 as MP for Foyle.

† Co-opted to replace an elected MLA

‡ Changed affiliation during the term

MLAs by constituency
The list is given in alphabetical order by constituency.

† Co-opted to replace an elected MLA
‡ Changed affiliation during the term

New members elected in May 2011

Twenty-five members of the third Assembly who were sitting at its dissolution on 24 March 2011 were succeeded by new members after the election of 5 May 2011. Seventeen sitting members did not present themselves for re-election and another eight were defeated at the polls. One re-elected member had been elected with a different affiliation in 2007.

The numbers indicate the percentage of votes each member received in the first round of counting under the Single Transferable Vote in the 2011 election, and the round which decided his or her election or defeat.

This is a sortable table arranged alphabetically by the new member's surname. In some constituencies (Foyle, West Tyrone and Fermanagh & South Tyrone) where it is not possible to couple a single outgoing member by party with a single successor, the incoming members are arranged alphabetically (so the second one may be out of alphabetic order with the rest of the table) and the outgoing members are arranged arbitrarily.

Member returning with a different affiliation

David McClarty, originally elected from East Londonderry as an Ulster Unionist, although not re-nominated by the UUP in 2011, stood successfully for re-election as an independent. This reduced the UUP's strength from 2007, while keeping independent strength in the Assembly at one (as Kieran Deeny, the retiring independent member, was not succeeded in West Tyrone by another independent). McClarty decided not to re-join the UUP after his re-election.

Changes since the election

† Co-options

‡ Changes in affiliation

See also
 Members of the Northern Ireland Assembly elected in 2007
 2011 Northern Ireland Assembly election
 Executive of the 4th Northern Ireland Assembly

References

 
Lists of members of the Northern Ireland Assembly